The International Conference on Distributed Computing Systems (ICDCS) is the oldest conference in the field of distributed computing systems in the world. It was launched by the IEEE Computer Society Technical Committee on Distributed Processing (TCDP) in October 1979, and is sponsored by such committee. It was started as an 18-month conference until 1983 and became an annual conference since 1984. The ICDCS has a long history of significant achievements and worldwide visibility, and has recently celebrated its 37th year.

Location history
 2019: Dallas, Texas, United States
 2018: Vienna, Austria
 2017: Atlanta, GA, United States 
 2016: Nara, Japan
 2015: Columbus, Ohio, United States
 2014: Madrid, Spain
 2013: Philadelphia, Pennsylvania, United States
 2012: Macau, China
 2011: Minneapolis, Minnesota, United States
 2010: Genoa, Italy
 2009: Montreal, Quebec, Canada
 2008: Beijing, China
 2007: Toronto, Ontario, Canada
 2006: Lisbon, Portugal
 2005: Columbus, Ohio, United States
 2004: Keio University, Japan
 2003: Providence, RI, United States
 2002: Vienna, Austria
 2001: Phoenix, AZ, United States
 2000: Taipei, Taiwan
 1999: Austin, TX, United States
 1998: Amsterdam, The Netherlands
 1997: Baltimore, MD, United States
 1996: Hong Kong
 1995: Vancouver,  Canada
 1994: Poznań, Poland
 1993: Pittsburgh, PA, United States
 1992: Yokohama, Japan
 1991: Arlington, TX, United States
 1990: Paris, France
 1989: Newport Beach, CA, United States
 1988: San Jose, CA, United States
 1987: Berlin, Germany
 1986: Cambridge, MA, United States
 1985: Denver, CO, United States
 1984: San Francisco, CA, United States
 1983: Hollywood, FL, United States
 1981: Versailles, France
 1979: Huntsville, AL, United States

See also
 List of distributed computing conferences

External links
 ICDCS 2018 - July 2–July 5, 2018, Vienna, Austria
 ICDCS 2007 - June 25–June 29, 2007, Toronto, Canada.
 ICDCS 2006 - July 4–July 7, 2006, Lisbon, Portugal.
 ICDCS 2005 - July 6–July 10, 2005, Columbus, Ohio, United States.
 ICDCS 2004 - March 23–March 26, 2004, Keio University, Japan.
 ICDCS 2003 - May 19–May 22, 2003, Providence, RI, United States.
 ICDCS 2002 - July 2–July 5, 2002, Vienna, Austria.
 ICDCS 2001 - April 16–April 19, 2001, Phoenix, AZ, United States.

Distributed computing conferences
Computer networking conferences